Porpentine Charity Heartscape (born 1987) is a video game designer, new media artist, writer and curator based in Oakland, California.  She is primarily a developer of hypertext games and interactive fiction mainly built using Twine. She has been awarded a Creative Capital grant, a Rhizome.org commission, the Prix Net Art, and a Sundance Institute's New Frontier Story Lab Fellowship. Her work was included in the 2017 Whitney Biennial. She was an editor for freeindiegam.es, a curated collection of free, independently produced games. She was a columnist for online PC gaming magazine Rock, Paper, Shotgun.

Game design 
Porpentine's 2012 Twine game Howling Dogs incorporates themes of escapism, violence and religious experience, though she has stated that it should be open to interpretation. She created Howling Dogs shortly after she started hormone-replacement therapy in 2012, in only seven days, while staying in a friend's remodeled barn.
It won the 2012 XYZZY awards in the "Best story" and "Best writing" categories.
The Boston Phoenix listed it as one of their  "Top 5 indie games of 2012".

During the 2013 Game Developers Conference, game designer Richard Hofmeier used the booth he had been given to showcase his own award-winning game Cart Life, to showcase Porpentine's Howling Dogs instead. Hofmeier spray-painted the words "Howling Dogs" across the banner of his own booth, and showed Porpentine's game instead of his own. Hofmeier stated he wished to give greater exposure to Porpentine's game.

In 2015 she released Eczema Angel Orifice, a compilation of over 20 hypertext works from 2012 to 2015. The compilation includes critically acclaimed games such as With Those We Love Alive, a queer fable about isolation, abuse, and the relationship between art and power; and Ultra Business Tycoon III, a sprawling textual world disguised as edutainment software.

In 2016, Rhizome commissioned Porpentine along with Neotenomie and Sloane through the series First Look: New Art Online resulting in Psycho Nymph Exile. This work includes an online hypertext work, a booklet, and stickers. The project depicts the experience of PTSD as a visceral physical substance, not an invisible, abstract force.

Selected works 
 Howling Dogs (2012)
 Their Angelical Understanding (2013)
 Ultra Business Tycoon III (2013)
 With Those We Love Alive (2014)
 Everything You Swallow Will One Day Come Up Like A Stone (2014)
 Neon Haze (2015)
 Aria End (2015)
 Psycho Nymph Exile (2016)
 No World Dreamers: Sticky Zeitgeist (2017)
 "The Decision So Many People Were Forced To Make Throughout History", Whose Future is It? (2018) (short story)

Awards

2012 
 XYZZY Best Writing for Howling Dogs
 "Golden Banana of Discord" for Howling Dogs at the 2012 Interactive Fiction Competition, a prize awarded for the highest standard deviation "both the most loved and the most hated."

2013 
 XYZZY Best Writing for their angelical understanding
 Indiecade Special Recognition for Porpentine's Twine Compilation
 Porpentine's Twine Compilation listed by the Museum of the Moving Image (New York City) as one of "25 Must-Play Video Games".

2014 
 XYZZY Best Writing and Best Individual NPC for With Those We Love Alive
 Wordplay Festival Award for Most Unique World: With Those We Love Alive

2016 
 Creative Capital Emerging Fields for Aria End (in collaboration with Peter Burr)
Otherwise Award Fellowship

2017 
 Prix Net Art, in collaboration with Rhizome and Chronus Art Center
With Those We Love Alive and howling dogs included in the Whitney Biennial

2018 

 Sundance Institute New Frontier Lab Programs Fellow

References

Further reading

External links

Howling Dogs
Vesp: A History of Sapphic Scaphism
Blog
Psycho Nymph Exile Secret Book

Living people
American video game designers
Transgender women
Interactive fiction writers
1987 births
Women video game designers
Electronic literature writers
American transgender writers